The 2001–02 Virginia Cavaliers men's basketball team represented the University of Virginia during the 2001–02 NCAA Division I men's basketball season. The team was led by fourth-year head coach Pete Gillen, and played their home games at University Hall in Charlottesville, Virginia as members of the Atlantic Coast Conference.

Last season
The Cavaliers had a record of 17-12, with a conference record of 7-9. They competed in the 2002 NIT Tournament, where they lost in the first round to South Carolina.

Roster

Schedule 
The Nov. 28, 2001 game between Michigan State and Virginia was cancelled with 15:04 in the second half, due to a wet floor at the Richmond Coliseum. When the game was called, Virginia led 31–28. Two days after the game, Virginia athletic director Craig Littlepage announced that the game would not be finished or restarted.

|-
!colspan=9 style="background:#00214e; color:#f56d22;"| Exhibition games

|-
!colspan=9 style="background:#00214e; color:#f56d22;"| Regular season

|-
!colspan=9 style="background:#00214e; color:#f56d22;"| ACC Tournament

|-
!colspan=9 style="background:#00214e; color:#f56d22;"| National Invitation Tournament

References

Virginia Cavaliers men's basketball seasons
Virginia
Virginia
Virginia Cavaliers men's basketball
2002 in sports in Virginia